MidCap Advisors, LLC is a boutique investment bank that specializes in mergers & acquisitions while also providing strategic planning, capital raising, and business valuation services to mid-market companies across the United States. The company has three groups: Insurance & Financial Services, Education, and Generalist (completing deals in the Transportation & Logistics, Manufacturing, Homeland Defense & Security, and Healthcare spaces).

History
The company was founded in 1989 by two former Chemical Bank (now known as JPMorgan Chase & Co.) executives, Douglas T. Hendrickson and John D. Poppe. Over the last twenty years, MidCap has worked on many significant deals across the middle market.

Operations
The company’s main office is located on the Upper East Side in New York City. MidCap also has offices in Chicago, Boston, Philadelphia, and Kansas City. MidCap currently has 20 employees across its multiples offices.

References

External links
MidCap Advisors website
MidCap Advisors Businessweek Profile
MidCap Advisors Company LinkedIn

Investment banks in the United States
Banks established in 1989
Financial services companies established in 1989
Banks based in New York City